Kanhaiya Lal Balmiki (14 March 1919 — 2 September 1985) was  an Indian politician. He along with Raghubar Dayal Misra were the 1st Lok Sabha MP from the Bulandshahr constituency of Uttar Pradesh as a member of the Indian National Congress. K.L. Balmiki also remained as MP in the 3rd Lok Sabha representing Khurja from 1962 to 1967.

Balmiki was born 14 March 1919 in the village of Khanai (Baluchistan). He was educated in Government Intermediate College, Allahabad and Meerut College. Married to Ramavati Devi on June 15, 1941, they have two sons and two daughters.

Balmiki actively participated in the Quit India Movement. As a student, he participated several times in Hartal and Satyagraha. He was imprisoned as a political detainee during 1943—1945.

References

External links
Official Biographical Sketch in Lok Sabha Website

1919 births
1985 deaths
Indian National Congress politicians
India MPs 1952–1957
India MPs 1957–1962
India MPs 1962–1967